Samuel Ray Cummings (born 1944) is a senior United States district judge of the United States District Court for the Northern District of Texas.

Education and career

Born in Lubbock, Texas, Cummings received a Bachelor of Business Administration from Texas Tech University in 1967 and a Juris Doctor from Baylor Law School in 1970. He was in private practice in Amarillo, Texas from 1970 to 1987.

Federal judicial service

On July 31, 1987, Cummings was nominated by President Ronald Reagan to a seat on the United States District Court for the Northern District of Texas vacated by Judge Halbert Owen Woodward. Cummings was confirmed by the United States Senate on December 8, 1987, and received his commission on December 9, 1987. He assumed senior status on December 31, 2014.

Notable cases

On March 1, 2001, Cummings issued an opinion in Tannahill v. Lockney I.S.D., which stated that it is a violation of the Fourth Amendment for school districts to have a mandatory whole school drug testing policy.

On November 16, 2016, Cummings issued a permanent nationwide injunction blocking President Barack Obama's "Persuader Rule", finding, that its attempt to require an employer's attorney to publicly disclose advise provided to persuade against unionization violated the First Amendment to the United States Constitution.

References

Sources
 

1944 births
Living people
Judges of the United States District Court for the Northern District of Texas
United States district court judges appointed by Ronald Reagan
20th-century American judges
Rawls College of Business alumni
21st-century American judges